Abū 'Alī Muḥammad al-Jubbā'ī  (died c. 915) was an Arab Mu'tazili influenced theologian and philosopher of the 10th century. Born in Khuzistan, he studied in Basra where he trained Abu al-Hasan al-Ash'ari, who went on to found his own theological tradition, and his son Abū Hāshīm al-Jubbā'ī.

References

Philosophers from the Abbasid Caliphate
9th-century births
910s deaths
Jubba'i
People from Khuzestan Province
10th-century Muslim scholars of Islam